Stacy Lynn Waddell (born 1966 Washington, DC) is an American artist. She attended North Carolina State University and the University of North Carolina at Chapel Hill. She was a finalist for the Factor Prize for Southern Art in 2008, and a recipient of a Joan Mitchell Painters and Sculptors Grant in 2010.

Waddell was included in the 2019 traveling exhibition Young, Gifted, and Black: The Lumpkin-Boccuzzi Family Collection of Contemporary Art. Her work is in the collection of the Studio Museum in Harlem.

References

Further reading 
Stacy Lynn Waddell interview by Lizzie Cheatham McNairy, Matrons & Mistresses, 2020

1966 births
Living people
20th-century American women artists
21st-century American women artists
Artists from Washington, D.C.
North Carolina State University alumni
University of North Carolina at Chapel Hill alumni